"With a Little Help from My Friends" is a song by the English rock band the Beatles, from their 1967 album Sgt. Pepper's Lonely Hearts Club Band. It was written by John Lennon and Paul McCartney and sung by drummer Ringo Starr (as Sgt. Pepper singer, Billy Shears), his lead vocal for the album. As the second track on the album, it segues from the applause of the title track.

A subsequent recording of the track by Joe Cocker became a success in 1968—topping the UK Singles Chart—and an anthem for the Woodstock era. In 1978, the Beatles' recording, paired with "Sgt. Pepper's Lonely Hearts Club Band", was reissued as a single, and peaked at number 63 in Britain and number 71 in the United States. Starr has regularly performed the song in concert as a solo artist. The song was ranked number 311 on Rolling Stones list of the 500 Greatest Songs of All Time.

Background and composition
Lennon and McCartney finished writing the song in mid-March 1967, written specifically as Starr's track for the album. McCartney said: "It was pretty much co-written, John and I doing a work song for Ringo, a little craft job." In 1970 Lennon stated: "Paul had the line about 'a little help from my friends.' He had some kind of structure for it, and we wrote it pretty well fifty-fifty from his original idea.", but in 1980 Lennon said: "This is Paul, with a little help from me. 'What do you see when you turn out the light/ I can't tell you, but I know it's mine...' is mine." It was briefly called "Bad Finger Boogie" (later the inspiration for the band name Badfinger), supposedly because Lennon composed the melody on a piano using his middle finger after having hurt his forefinger.

Lennon and McCartney deliberately wrote a tune with a limited rangeexcept for the last note, which McCartney worked closely with Starr to achieve. In The Beatles Anthology, Starr explained that he insisted on changing the first linewhich originally was "What would you think if I sang out of tune? Would you throw ripe tomatoes at me?"so that fans would not throw tomatoes at him should he perform it live (in the early days, after George Harrison made a passing comment that he liked Jelly Babies, the group was showered with them at all of their live performances).

After it was released in the United States, Maryland Governor and future Vice President Spiro T. Agnew lobbied to have the song banned because he believed it was about drug use.

Recording
The Beatles began recording the song on 29 March 1967, the day before they posed for the Sgt. Pepper album cover. They recorded 10 takes of the song, wrapping up sessions at 5:45 in the morning. The backing track consisted of Starr on drums, McCartney playing piano, Harrison playing lead guitar and Lennon beating a cowbell. At dawn, Starr trudged up the stairs to head home – but the other Beatles cajoled him into doing his lead vocal then and there, standing around the microphone for moral support.  The following day they added tambourine, backing vocals, bass and more electric guitar. American TeenSet editor Judith Sims interviewed each Beatle separately on the 29th as they became available. Others in the studio at various times included roadies Mal Evans and Neil Aspinall, publicists Tony Barrow and Terry Doran, photographers Leslie Bryce and Frank Herrmann, and Cynthia Lennon.

Personnel
According to Ian MacDonald:

The Beatles
Ringo Starr – lead vocal, drums, tambourine
John Lennon – backing vocal, rhythm guitar, cowbell
Paul McCartney – backing vocal, piano, bass
George Harrison – backing vocal, lead guitar
Additional musician
George Martin – Hammond organ

Live performances
To date, Starr has closed every concert performed by each version of his All-Starr Band with this song. After he is done singing, Starr tells the audience "Peace and love... peace and love is the only way... and good night", then walks off the stage. Since 2008, the band segued right into "Give Peace a Chance", during which Starr comes back onstage, then walks off again.

Starr performed the song with George Harrison, Eric Clapton, Bruce Springsteen, George Michael, Phil Collins, Elton John, and many others at the 1987 Prince's Trust Concert at Wembley Arena, London.

The September 3 and 4, 1989 performances at the Greek Theatre in Los Angeles appeared on the CD version of the charity album Nobody's Child: Romanian Angel Appeal.

McCartney and Starr performed this song together for the first time since 1967 at the David Lynch Foundation Benefit Concert in the Radio City Music Hall, New York on 4 April 2009. McCartney and Starr also performed the song together on "The Night That Changed America: A Grammy Salute to The Beatles", a commemorative show on 27 January 2014, that marked 50 years since the band's first appearance on The Ed Sullivan Show, then again in 2015 at Ringo Starr's induction into the Rock and Roll Hall of Fame.

Certifications

Cover versions
There have been at least 50 cover versions of the song and it has achieved the number one position on the British singles charts three times: by Joe Cocker in 1968, by Wet Wet Wet in 1988, and by Sam & Mark in 2004.

Joe Cocker version

English singer Joe Cocker's version of "With a Little Help from My Friends" was a radical re-arrangement of the original, inspired by Cocker's influences of Aretha Franklin and Ray Charles. Recorded by Denny Cordell and Tony Visconti, it used a slower tempo than the original and deployed different chords in the middle eight while adding a lengthy instrumental introduction. The recording featured drums by Procol Harum's B.J. Wilson, guitar lines from Jimmy Page, and organ by Tommy Eyre as well as prominent backing vocals.  After recording the song, Cocker and record producer Denny Cordell brought it to Paul McCartney, who later said of the recording, "it was just mind blowing, totally turned the song into a soul anthem and I was forever grateful for him for doing that."

Cocker's version of the song reached number one on the UK Singles Chart on the week of 6–12 November 1968. The version also peaked at number 68 on the Billboard Hot 100 (US) on the week of 14 December, number two on the Dutch Top 40 (Netherlands) on the week of 9 November, and number one on Swiss Hitparade's top 100 singles chart on the week of 3 December. In Belgium's Ultratop 50 singles charts, it also peaked at number one on the Wallonia chart on the weeks of 14 and 21 December and number eight on the Flanders chart on the week of 7 December.

Cocker performed the song at Woodstock in 1969 and that performance was included in the documentary film, Woodstock. Two weeks later he performed it at the Isle of Wight Festival 1969. This version gained even more fame when it was used as the opening theme song for the television series The Wonder Years. In 2002 he would perform the song at the Party at the Palace held at Buckingham Palace Garden in commemoration of the Golden Jubilee of Queen Elizabeth II. In 2014, a BBC poll saw it voted the seventh best cover song ever. In 2001, Cocker's version of the song was inducted into the Grammy Hall of Fame.

Personnel
Joe Cocker – lead vocals
Jimmy Page – guitar
Chris Stainton – bass
Tommy Eyre – organ
B.J. Wilson – drums
Madeline Bell – backing vocals
Rosetta Hightower – backing vocals
Patrice Holloway – backing vocals
Sunny Wheetman – backing vocals

Charts

Certifications

Wet Wet Wet version 

In 1988, Scottish soft rock band Wet Wet Wet covered the song for the Sgt. Pepper's Lonely Hearts Club Band tribute album Sgt. Pepper Knew My Father. The song was released as a single in May 1988 double-A-sided with another cover from the album, "She's Leaving Home" by Billy Bragg and Cara Tivey. Wet Wet Wet's version debuted at Number 5 on the UK Singles Chart on 14 May 1988.

Charts

Certifications

Sam & Mark version

The UK duo Sam & Mark released a cover of the song in 2004 after coming third and second in the second and final series of Pop Idol. Their version topped the UK Singles Chart.

Tracklist
"With a Little Help from My Friends" - 3:08
"Measure of a Man" 4:00
"With a Little Help from My Friends" (Video) - 3:08

Credits
Arrangement - Sindre Hotvedt, David Eriksen
Conductor – Sindre Hotvedt
Backing Vocals – Håkon Iversen, Mariann Lisland
Electric Piano [Fender Rhodes] – Martin Sjolie
Assistant engineer – Nick Taylor
Guitar – Eivind Aarset
Strings - Sindre Hotvedt, Oslo Session Strings
Keyboards, Drum Programming, Drums (Additional Live) – David Eriksen
Mixing – Niklas Flyckt
Assistant Mixing – Jonas Östman
Assistant producer – Martin Sjolie
Producer - David Eriksen
Recording – David Eriksen
Mastering – Richard Dowling

Charts

Other covers
Two versions of the song made the UK Singles Chart in 1967. The Young Idea's version peaked at number ten and spent 6 weeks in the top 75, while a version by Joe Brown charted at the same time, peaking at number 32 and remaining in the top 75 for 4 weeks.

The Canadian band Kick Axe reached number 79 in Canada with their version, January 18, 1986.

In 2018, the track returned as a charity released by the NHS Voices with all benefits going to the UK National Health Service (NHS). The charity version reached only number 89 and stayed just 1 week on the UK charts.

References

Bibliography

External links
 
 How B.J. Wilson Rescued a Classic Joe Cocker Track (page about B.J. Wilson and Joe Cocker's recording of the song)

 

1967 songs
1968 singles
1988 singles
The Beatles songs
Songs about friendship
Barbra Streisand songs
Joe Cocker songs
The Beach Boys songs
Ike & Tina Turner songs
Number-one singles in Switzerland
Sham 69 songs
Song recordings produced by George Martin
Songs written by Lennon–McCartney
UK Singles Chart number-one singles
Wet Wet Wet songs
Song recordings produced by Jeff Lynne
Capitol Records singles
Parlophone singles
PolyGram singles
Regal Zonophone Records singles
A&M Records singles
19 Recordings singles
Songs published by Northern Songs
Comedy television theme songs
Ringo Starr songs